Havasu Wilderness is a  wilderness area located within the Havasu National Wildlife Refuge near Lake Havasu in the U.S. states of Arizona and California.   are located in Arizona and  are located in California.

The western boundary of the Wilderness is formed by the Colorado River.  The area includes volcanic spires, a large sand dune with vegetation varying from riparian wetlands to Mojave Desert uplands.  The habitats here consist of open water, emergent vegetation, subaquatics, dry mountains, desert uplands and washes.

Vegetation
Vegetation in Havasu Wilderness is dominated by creosote bush, ocotillo, blue-green paloverde, and pockets of saguaro.  A variety of trees grow in washes with willows and salt cedar found at the edges of the river.

Wildlife
Havasu Wilderness is home to a variety of wildlife, including species of quail, geese, duck, grebe, crane, rail (including the endangered Yuma rail), heron, egret, falcon, eagle, desert bighorn sheep, coyote, porcupine, fox, and bobcat. Gila monster and the endangered desert tortoise can also be found in the wilderness.

Recreation
Fires, mechanized vehicles, some types of boats, and camping are not permitted in Havasu Wilderness.  The most common activities are hiking and wildlife watching.

See also
 List of Arizona Wilderness Areas
 List of U.S. Wilderness Areas
 Wilderness Act

References

External links
 Hiking on Havasu Wilderness – Havasu National Wildlife Refuge
 Regulations of Havasu NWR – Havasu National Wildlife Refuge
 Havasu Wilderness – Wilderness.net

Protected areas of Mohave County, Arizona
Protected areas of San Bernardino County, California
Wilderness areas of Arizona
Wilderness areas of California
Wilderness areas within the Lower Colorado River Valley